"Laugh a Little Louder Please" is the third episode of the fifth and final series of the period drama Upstairs, Downstairs. It first aired on 21 September 1975 on ITV.

Background
Laugh a Little Louder Please was recorded in the studio on 6 and 7 February 1975. Rosemary Anne Sisson, the writer of this episode, used We Danced All Night, the autobiography of Barbara Cartland, party as an inspiration for this episode. We Danced All Night was also used for other episodes in which Georgina played a main role. Sisson also 
brought some of her own experiences and feelings, as a child in the Second World War, into this episode. In Laugh a Little Louder Please Madeleine Cannon makes her first appearance as Lady Dolly Hale.

Cast
Lesley-Anne Down - Georgina Worsley
Angela Baddeley - Mrs Bridges
Gordon Jackson - Hudson 
Jean Marsh - Rose
Simon Williams - James Bellamy
Celia Bannerman - Diana Newbury
Christopher Beeny - Edward
Osmond Bullock - Captain Robin Eliott
Karen Dotrice - Lily
Jacqueline Tong - Daisy
Gareth Hunt - Frederick
Jenny Tomasin - Ruby 
Shirley Cain - Miss Treadwell
John Quayle - Bunny Newbury
Madeleine Cannon - Lady Dolly Hale
Trevor Ray - The Hon. Tommy Spenton
Anne Yarker - Alice Hamilton
Jonathan Seely - William Hamilton
Marsha Fitzalan - Bluebird (Party Guest)
Julia Schofield - Geraldine (Party Guest dressed as Charlie Chaplin)
Victor Langley - Bather (Party Guest)
Nicholas Hunter - Red Indian (Party Guest)

Plot
It is Summer 1921, and Georgina, James, Diana Newbury and Captain Robin Eliott, decide to hold a fancy dress "Freedom Party" while Richard and Virginia are away in Geneva on League of Nations business. Shortly after the Party has started, Miss Treadwell, Alice and William's new Governess, arrives at Eaton Place. Later in the evening, Georgina and Robin are upstairs in the nursery talking and Robin asks Georgina to marry him. When she says no, Robin says that he will kill himself if she does not as he can not live without her. She does not believe him and walks out of the room. Not long after, Miss Treadwell finds that Robin has shot himself just outside the nursery. Hudson, who arrived seconds after Miss Treadwell found the body, reads a letter that Captain Eliott had written on the back of a drawing from the nursery. It read "My dearest Georgina. You will never know how much I loved you. My life would be unbearable without you. God bless. Robin". Hudson screws this up before James and Georgina arrive. The following morning, Georgina carries on as normal merely saying "it did rather spoil the party, didn't it?".

Meanwhile, Edward suggests to Daisy that they emigrate to Canada, but Daisy reminds him how lucky they are compared to many others. Diana Newbury and James talk about her marriage to Bunny, and she shows little affection for him.

Footnotes

References
Richard Marson, "Inside UpDown - The Story of Upstairs, Downstairs", Kaleidoscope Publishing, 2005
Updown.org.uk - Upstairs, Downstairs Fansite

Upstairs, Downstairs (series 5) episodes
1975 British television episodes
Fiction set in 1921